The Class 66 is a type of six-axle diesel-electric freight locomotive developed in part from the , for use on the railways of the UK. Since its introduction the class has been successful and has been sold to British and other European railway companies. In Continental Europe it is marketed as the EMD Class 66 (JT42CWR).

History

Background 
On the privatisation of British Rail's freight operations in 1996, Wisconsin Central Transportation Systems under the control of Ed Burkhardt bought a number of the newly privatised rail freight companies: Transrail Freight, Mainline Freight, Loadhaul, and later, Railfreight Distribution and Rail Express Systems; thus controlling 93% of UK rail freight. After a public relations exercise involving the input of the general public, the company was named English Welsh & Scottish Railway (EWS).

EWS inherited a fleet of 1,600, mainly diesel, locomotives, with an average age of over 30 years; 300 had been cannibalised for spares. Typical of the fleet, the 2,580 hp Class 47s needed a major overhaul every seven years, costing £400,000; yet had an average daily availability of less than 65% with only 16 days between major failures. To enable it to offer its stated lower pricing to customers, EWS needed to reduce operating costs and increase availability.

Order and specification 
After reviewing the existing privately commissioned , which was more powerful, highly reliable and with lower operating costs, EWS approached its builder Electro-Motive Diesel (EMD), then a division of General Motors. EMD offered their JT42CWR model, which had the same loading gauge-passing bodyshell as the Class 59. The engine and traction motors were different models to enable higher speeds, and the Class 66s incorporated General Motors' version of a "self-steering bogie" ("radial truck", in American usage), designed to reduce track wear and increase adhesion on curves.

Placing what was termed as "the biggest British loco order since steam days", EWS placed an order for 250 units in May 1996 to be built at the EMD plant in London, Ontario, Canada at a cost of £375 million. Financed by Locomotion Capital (later Angel Trains), the first locomotives were ready in early 1998; the fastest delivery of an all-new locomotive type by GM.

The EMD 710 12-cylinder diesel engine is a development of a two-stroke engine used for over 20 years, whilst the EM2000 control equipment is the same as that used on Irish Railways IE 201 Class.

United Kingdom 

The first locomotive shipped to the UK arrived at Immingham in June 1998, taken to Derby for testing. The second was taken to AAR's Pueblo Test Centre for endurance testing, before shipping to the UK. The locomotives then shipped at a rate of 11 per month into the UK via Newport Docks, until the order was completed in December 2001. After unloading, EWS engineers then simply took off the tarpaulin, unblocked the suspension, and finally as each was shipped with water and fuel, connected the batteries, before starting the engine and handing the locomotive into service. The ability to simply start up '66s' on the dockside and drive them under their own power to depots to enter service was nothing short of a revelation compared with many other BR locomotives, particularly the BR Class 60s.

Each locomotive is specified and guaranteed to 95% availability, aiming for a minimum of 180 days mean time between failures. It is designed to cover 1.6 million km between major rebuilds, equivalent to 18 years' service, with each major rebuild costed at £200,000.

The initial classification was as Class 61, then they were subsequently given the Class 66 designation in the British classification system (TOPS). In 1998 Freightliner placed an order for locomotives. They were followed by GB Railfreight, and then Direct Rail Services. The last of more than 500 built over an 18-year period was No 66779, Evening Star, delivered to GB Railfreight in spring 2016.

Although sometimes unpopular with many rail enthusiasts, due to their ubiquity and having caused the displacement of several older types of (mostly) British built locomotives, their high reliability has helped rail freight to remain competitive. Rail enthusiasts labelled the type "The Red Death" as they displaced many older types of locomotive whilst also acquiring the nicknames of "sheds" for the EWS (now DBS) locomotives (due to their upturned roof looking like a shed roof) with the Freightliner locomotives being called "Freds" as a portmanteau of Freightliner and Shed.

Continental Europe 

The Class 66 design has also been introduced to Continental Europe where it is currently certified for operations in Germany, the Netherlands, Belgium, Luxembourg, Sweden, Norway, Denmark, France, and Poland, with certification pending in the Czech Republic and Italy. They currently operate on routes in Sweden and Denmark and between Germany, Belgium, The Netherlands and Poland. As a result of its well-known British identity, EMD Europe markets the locomotive as "Series 66".

UK importation 
By 2011, following an increase in UK rail traffic after the 2008 Global Economic Crisis, EMD were struggling to source critical components of the locomotive — specifically castings. The final units of the Class 66 were produced in the London, Ontario plant that year following an industrial dispute and the introduction of new EU crash and emissions regulations which culminated in the cessation of production.

Due to a reduction in European freight volumes, since mid-2012, a number of EMD Series 66 locomotives have been imported by UK rail freight operators and converted to UK type specifications. To date:
GBRf bought three ex-Dutch locos, in 2012, which have been numbered 66747-749. The former identities of these were DE6316, DE6313 and DE6315 respectively.
GBRf bought two ex-German "Rush Rail" locomotives, in 2013, which have been numbered 66750 & 66751. The former identities of these were DE6606 (also T664025) and DE6609 (also 2906) respectively
GBRf bought three ex-Swedish locomotives, in 2019, which have been numbered 66790-792. The former identities of these were T66403, T66404 and T66405 respectively.

In September 2013, GB Railfreight announced a new order of a further 8 Class 66/7 locomotives from EMD, the first of the class to be built at EMD's Muncie, Indiana plant. On 2 February GBRf ordered a further 13 locomotives. These 21 locomotives are numbered 66752-772. Numbers 66752-756 were shipped from America and arrived at Newport Docks in July 2014. No. 66752 has been named The Hoosier State, a nickname for Indiana. A further seven locomotives (66773-779) were later added to the fleet, utilising six power units that had been in the UK, plus one recovered from the scrapped 66734. The presence of these power units in the UK circumvented European emission compliance regulations and permitted them to be exported to EMD Muncie for installation in further class 66 bodyshells.

Emission compliance 
Numbers 66752-779 were the last Class 66s ordered for service in Great Britain because of increasingly stringent emission regulations. 66779 was the last Class 66 ever to be built. Although the Class 66s meet stage 3a of the regulations, they do not meet stage 3b. Stage 3b would have required additional exhaust treatment equipment that could not easily be accommodated within the UK loading gauge. The restriction does not apply to second-hand locomotives, provided that they are imported from within the European Union. The purpose of the regulation was to put a cap on the total number of non-compliant locomotives in the EU.

Current operators

Colas Rail 

Colas Rail took over the ex-Advenza Cemex Cement flow after the company went bust, initially using the five former Advenza Freight and Direct Rail Services locomotives 66406-410 which had been renumbered 66841-845. Subsequently, as part of a deal with GB Railfreight, Colas Rail replaced them with five ex-Freightliner 66573-577 which were renumbered 66846–850. The five ex-Direct Rail Services class 66s were transferred to GB Railfreight and renumbered 66742–746.

DB Cargo UK 

DB Cargo UK bought out EWS. Their Class 66 fleet includes four locomotives capable of banking heavy trains over the Lickey Incline. On these specific locomotives, the knuckle coupler has been modified to allow remote releasing from inside the cab, whilst in motion. It also includes fifteen locomotives fitted with RETB signalling equipment, for working in northern Scotland and RETB-fitted branchlines. A few DB Cargo UK Class 66s are now working in Europe as part of DB Cargo France and DB Cargo Polska.

Direct Rail Services 

Direct Rail Services (DRS), which at the time was a subsidiary of British Nuclear Fuels (BNFL), ordered ten Class 66/4 locomotives (66401–410) in 2002, employed on new Anglo-Scottish traffic, some with Stobart Rail. In 2006, ten more T2 specification units (66411–420) were delivered, a further ten (66421–430) in late 2007, and four more (66431–434) in 2008.

After the first 20 Class 66s operated by DRS were transferred to Freightliner and GB Railfreight, leaving just 14 in their fleet, DRS leased the five former Fastline Freight locomotives.

Freightliner 

Freightliner followed EWS by initially ordering five new Class 66/5 locomotives, and have continued to order in small batches. As of 2020, the Class 66/5 fleet had reached 89 examples; 66521 was withdrawn after the 2001 crash at Great Heck and later scrapped.

In 2000 a new Class 66/6 sub-class was built, with a lower gear ratio, enabling heavier trains to be hauled, albeit at slower speed. There are presently 25 examples of this class, numbered 66601-625. Some of these locomotives have since been exported for use with Freightliner Poland.

During 2004 the company took delivery of the most recent Class 66/9 sub-class of the locomotive, which are a low-emission variant. All new locomotives for all companies are now of the low-emission "T2" type. The seven such locomotives as 66951-957.

In 2011, Freightliner took on Direct Rail Services' 66411-420.

GB Railfreight 

GB Railfreight initially leased seventeen Class 66/7 locomotives, before increasing its fleet to 32. During April 2006 five more low-emission locomotives (numbered 66718-722) were delivered, liveried for use on the Metronet/Transport for London contracts. A further order for five more locomotives (66723-727) was delivered in early 2007, and another five locomotives (66728–732) in April 2008. 66733-746 are formed of Class 66s from Direct Rail Services, Freightliner and Colas Rail. In 2011 66720 was painted in a special "Rainbow" livery. In June 2012, 66734 derailed at Loch Treig whilst working 6S45 North Blyth–Fort William and was consequently cut up on site and scrapped.

The final seven Class 66s to be built for the British market arrived on 12 February 2016 aboard the cargo ship Happy Dragon at Newport docks and consisted of numbers 66773–779. On 15 February they were towed by 66708 north to Doncaster Roberts Road depot where they were commissioned and then put to work.

66779 remained under a tarpaulin until 10 May 2016 when it was revealed at the NRM York with a special livery and nameplates to commemorate the fact it is the final Class 66 ever built for the British market. The locomotive has been painted in BR Lined Green and named Evening Star, in reference to BR Standard Class 9F 92220 Evening Star which was the last BR steam locomotive to be built. It was unveiled in a special ceremony inside the Great Hall at the National Railway Museum in York on 10 May 2016 before staying there opposite its namesake, No. 92220, for two weeks. At the same ceremony, the CEO of GBRf, John Smith, handed the curator of the National Railway Museum a document offering 66779 to the national collection when it is retired in about 40 years time.

In addition to those locomotives sourced from domestic operators (Direct Rail Services, Freightliner, Colas Rail and DB Cargo UK), eight further locomotives have been obtained from European operators. A further five have been purchased from Heavy Haul Power International and will be transferred from Germany beginning in April 2021. The locos will go to Doncaster to be converted to UK specification.

Former operators

Advenza Freight 
Advenza Freight, a Cotswold Rail subsidiary, operated Class 66841-844. They were primarily used on Advenza's scrap and cement flows. The locomotives originated from the batch that Direct Rail Services returned.

Advenza Freight ceased operations in October 2009 and the Class 66s returned to storage. These locos were housed at Gloucester Carriage Sidings where Advenza Freight was based.

Fastline 

Fastline operated intermodal services between Doncaster and Birmingham International Railfreight Terminal (BIFT), and Thamesport, in North Kent, using refurbished  locomotives. The company ordered five Class 66/3 locomotives to operate a coal flow from Hatfield Colliery, which were delivered in 2008.

Following the demise of Jarvis in 2010, and Fastline going into administration on 29 March 2010, these locomotives were placed in storage, being towed to Direct Rail Services' Carlisle Kingmoor and Crewe Gresty Lane depots for storage. During 2011, DRS repainted the five ex-Fastline locomotives and added them to their own fleet, keeping their original numbers.

Poor working environment 
The British train drivers' union ASLEF has complained that the locomotives are unfit and unsafe to work in, citing excessive heat, noise levels and poor seating.

In April 2007, ASLEF proposed a ban on their members driving the locomotives during the British summer 2007 period. Keith Norman, ASLEF's general secretary, described the cabs as "unhealthy, unsafe and unsatisfactory". Research showed that in July 2006, when the weather had been extremely hot, the number of incidents where a driver had passed a signal at danger (SPAD) increased. EWS entered into discussions and made amendments to a series of trial locomotives, GB Railfreight and Freightliner also investigated cab improvements. In June 2007, progress on the issue led ASLEF to withdraw its threat of industrial action.

In Norway, CargoNet related complaints about the noise levels in the CD66 variant of the Class 66 resulted in higher pay rates for drivers.

Accidents and incidents 
 On 28 February 2001, 66521 was involved in the 2001 Great Heck rail crash which resulted in 10 deaths including the driver Stephen Dunn. The locomotive was written off and scrapped as a result of major damage sustained in the accident.
 On 9 February 2006, a freight train hauled by English Welsh & Scottish 66017, derailed at Brentingby Junction near Melton Mowbray. Having passed a signal at danger, the locomotive and the first three wagons were derailed at catch points at the end of the Up Goods Loop. There were no injuries.

 On 4 January 2010, a freight train, hauled by 66048, derailed at Carrbridge in snowy weather, blocking the Highland Main Line. Having passed a signal at danger the train was derailed at trap points, subsequently falling down an embankment into trees and injuring the two crew members. The locomotive was hauling container flats from Inverness to Mossend Yard on behalf of Stobart Rail. The line was reopened on 12 January.
 On 21 November 2011, 66111 derailed between Exeter Central and Exeter St Davids on working an engineering works service.
 On 28 June 2012, GBRf operated 66734 derailed at Loch Treig whilst working the 6S45 North Blyth to Fort William Alcan Tanks. Due to its position and the environmental risks associated with recovery, after agreement from owners Porterbrook it was cut-up on site and the mechanics recycled as spare parts.
 On 1 August 2015, 66428 was hauling an engineering train that ran into the rear of another engineering train at Logan, Ayrshire. It was severely damaged. The train that was run into was hauled by 66305.
 On 14 August 2017, 66713 was hauling a freight train that derailed near , due to defective suspension on the wagon that was first to derail.
 On 4 September 2018, 66230 was hauling a freight train which collided with a vehicle on a level crossing at Dollands Moor Freight Yard, Kent. One cab was extensively damaged in the post-impact fire. The locomotive was stored in Toton TMD.
 On 23 January 2020, 66154 was hauling a freight train which derailed at Wanstead Park and ran for  before stopping near  station.
No one was injured. The driver of the locomotive was subsequently convicted of an offence contrary to the Health and Safety at Work Act 1974. He was sentenced to 8 months' imprisonment, suspended for 18 months.
The derailment was caused by broken rail fastenings which allowed the track to spread.
The locomotive and three wagons were derailed.
 On 21 December 2021, a GBRf Class 66 locomotive working Hams Hall (near Birmingham) to London Gateway derailed on the down Thames Haven line while on the approach to London Gateway port, near to Stanford-le-Hope in Essex.
On 5 July 2022, 66729 was hauling a freight train that passed a signal at danger and ran into the rear of another freight train near Loversall Carr Jn, Doncaster.
 On 19 October 2022 66739 hauled a loaded cement train from Clitheroe Castle Cement Gb to Carlisle N.Y. before 8 wagons derailed at Petteril Bridge Junction with 2 crashing into the River Petteril and 1 half way down the embankment.

Sub-classes 
Minor differences between different orders, and different operating companies have resulted in a number of subclasses being defined.

Names

Models 
In 2006 Hornby Railways launched its first version of the BR Class 66 in OO gauge range in a variety of liveries.

Since 2019 Hattons have offered a variety of paint schemes for their class 66 model in OO gauge.

Notes

References

Sources

Further reading

External links 

66
Co-Co locomotives
Electro-Motive Diesel locomotives
Railway locomotives introduced in 1998
Electro-Motive Division locomotives
Standard gauge locomotives of Great Britain
Diesel-electric locomotives of Great Britain